Richard Bland (May 6, 1710 – October 26, 1776), sometimes referred to as Richard Bland II or Richard Bland of Jordan's Point, was an American Founding Father, planter and statesman from Virginia. A cousin and early mentor of Thomas Jefferson, Bland belonged to one of the colony's leading families. He served more than 30 years in the House of Burgesses, Virginia's colonial legislative assembly.

In 1766, Bland wrote an influential pamphlet, An Inquiry into the Rights of the British Colonies, questioning the right of the British Parliament to impose taxes on colonists without their consent. He later served in the First Continental Congress where he signed the Continental Association, a trade embargo adopted in October 1774 in opposition to Parliament's so-called Intolerable Acts. Bland retired from the Second Continental Congress due to his age in August 1775, two months after the creation of the Continental Army. However, he remained active in Virginia politics and helped draft a constitution for the newly-formed state in June 1776. Bland was named to Virginia's House of Delegates when it was formed in October 1776, the same month as his death.

Family and early life
His father, Richard Bland I, was a member of one of the patriarchal First Families of Virginia and was related to many of the others. This branch of the Bland family first came to Virginia in 1654, when Theodorick Bland of Westover, emigrated from London and Spain. After the death of his older brother Edward Bland in 1653, Theodorick moved to Virginia to take over management of the family mercantile and shipping enterprises there. Theodorick established Berkeley Plantation and Westover Plantation, both properties survive still, side by side, as working plantations on the banks of the James River. Theodorick served several terms in the House of Burgesses and was its speaker in 1660 when he married Anna Bennett, the daughter of Virginia Governor Richard Bennett. Before he died in 1671 Theodorick and Anna had three sons: Theodorick, Richard I, and John.

Mary Bland (1703), married Capt. Henry Lee I
Elizabeth Bland (1706), married William Beverley
Richard Bland II (1710)
Anna Bland (1711) (married Robert Munford)
Theodorick (1718)

Marriage and Issue
Bland married Anne Poythress (December 13, 1712 – April 9, 1758), the daughter of Colonel Peter and Ann Poythress, from Henrico County, Virginia. The couple married at Jordan's Point on March 21, 1729, and made it their home. 
Together they had twelve children: 
Richard Bland(b. 20 February 1731)
Elizabeth Bland (b. 17 March 1733)
Ann Bland (b. 15 August 1735)
Peter Bland (b. 2 February 1737, d.16 February 1781)
John Bland (b. 19 October 1739)
Mary Bland (b. 15 January 1741)
William Bland (b. 26 December 1742)
Theodorick Bland (b. 28 September 1744)
Edward Bland (b. 16 December 1746)
Sarah Bland (b. 19 September 1750)
Susan Bland (b. 20 February 1752)
Lucy Bland (b. 22 September 1754).

After Anne's death, Richard married twice more. On January 1, 1759, Bland married Martha Macon Massie, the widow of William Massie, who died eight months after their marriage. In 1760 he married for a third time to Elizabeth Blair Bolling, widow of John Bolling and sister of councilor John Blair. Elizabeth died late in April 1775. Richard Bland survived all of his wives. There were no children of the 2nd and 3rd marriages.

Early political career 

Bland served as a justice of the peace in Prince George County and was made a militia officer in 1739. In 1742, he was elected to the Virginia House of Burgesses, where he served successive terms until it was suppressed during the American Revolution. Bland's thoughtful work made him one of its leaders, although he was not a strong speaker. He frequently served on committees whose role was to negotiate or frame laws and treaties. Sometimes described as a bookish scholar as well as farmer, Bland read law and was admitted to the Virginia bar in 1746. He did not practice before the courts but collected legal documents and became known for his expertise in Virginia and British history and law.

Bland often published pamphlets (frequently anonymously), as well as letters. His first widely distributed public paper came as a result of the Parson's Cause, which was a debate from 1759 to 1760 over the established church and the kind and rate of taxes used to pay the Anglican clergy. His pamphlet A Letter to the Clergy on the Two-penny Act was printed in 1760, as he opposed increasing pay and the creation of a bishop for the colonies.

An early critic of slavery, though a slaveholder, Bland stated "under English government all men are born free", which prompted considerable debate with John Camm, a professor at Bland's alma mater, the College of William & Mary.

Colonial rights advocate 
When the Stamp Act created controversy throughout the colonies, Richard Bland thought through the entire issue of parliamentary laws as opposed to those that originated in the colonial assemblies. While others, particularly James Otis, get more credit for the idea of "no taxation without representation", the full argument for this position seems to come from Bland. In early 1766, he wrote An Inquiry into the Rights of the British Colonies, which was published in Williamsburg and reprinted in England. Bland's Inquiry examines the relationship of the king, parliament, and the colonies. While he concludes that the colonies were subject to the crown and that colonists should enjoy the rights of Englishmen, he questions the presumption that total authority and government came through parliament and its laws. Jefferson described the work as "the first pamphlet on the nature of the connection with Great Britain which had any pretension to accuracy of view on that subject...There was more sound matter in his pamphlet than in the celebrated Farmer's letters."<ref?</ref>

In September 1774, the Virginia Burgesses sent Bland to the First Continental Congress in Philadelphia. Some of the views expressed in An Inquiry into the Rights of the British Colonies found their way into the first session of the Congress and were included in the Declaration of Rights.
Bland was elected to the Second Continental Congress, serving until August 12, 1775, when he declined another term because of his age.

Founding the state of Virginia

In 1775, as revolution neared in Virginia, the Virginia Convention replaced the Burgesses and the council as a form of ad-hoc government. That year he met with the Burgesses and with the three sessions of the convention. In March 1775, after Patrick Henry's "Give me liberty, or give me death!" speech, he was still opposed to taking up arms. He believed that reconciliation with England was still possible and desirable. Nevertheless, he was named to the committee of safety and re-elected as a delegate to the national Congress. In May, he travelled to Philadelphia for the opening of the Second Continental Congress, but soon returned home, withdrawing because of the poor health and failing eyesight of old age. However, his radicalism had increased, and by the convention's meeting in July, he proposed hanging Lord Dunmore, the royal governor.

In the first state convention meeting of 1776, Richard Bland declined a re-election to the Third Continental Congress, citing his age and health. However, he played an active role in the remaining conventions. He served on the committee which drafted Virginia's first constitution in 1776. When the House of Delegates for the new state government was elected, he was one of the members.

Death and legacy 
Bland died while serving in the state House on October 26, 1776, at Williamsburg. In November he was buried in the family cemetery at Jordan's Point in Prince George County.  Virginia's Bland County and Richard Bland College, junior college of the College of William & Mary, are named in his honor.

Notes

References

External links
 
 Richard Bland at Encyclopedia Virginia
 Richard Bland, Revolutionary Philosopher Press Release by Marjorie Solenberger (July 1994)
 

1710 births
1776 deaths
College of William & Mary alumni
People from Prince George County, Virginia
American people of English descent
Huguenot participants in the American Revolution
Continental Congressmen from Virginia
18th-century American politicians
House of Burgesses members
Richard
Randolph family of Virginia
American planters
Members of the Virginia House of Delegates
American slave owners
Signers of the Continental Association